Gar Chongsar or  Gar Xincun, Gar New Village, is a village in Gar County, Ngari Prefecture, Tibet Autonomous Region, China. It is the site of the Ngari Gunsa Airport.

See also
List of towns and villages in Tibet

References

Populated places in Tibet